Lopacidia is a genus of lichenized fungi in the family Lecideaceae. This is a monotypic genus, containing the single species Lopacidia multilocularis.

References

Lecideales
Taxa described in 1984
Lichen genera
Lecideales genera
Taxa named by Klaus Kalb